The 1914–15 Colgate Raiders men's basketball team represented Colgate University during the 1914–15 college men's basketball season. The head coach was Walt Hammond, coaching the Raiders in his second season. The team had finished with a final record of 11–4. The team captain was Herb Benzoni.

Schedule

|-

References

Colgate Raiders men's basketball seasons
Colgate
Colgate
Colgate